The Propulsion and Structural Test Facility, also known as Building 4572 and the Static Test Stand, is a rocket testing facility of the George C. Marshall Space Flight Center in Huntsville, Alabama.  Built in 1957, it was the site where the first single-stage rockets with multiple engines were tested.  It was declared a National Historic Landmark in 1985 for its role in the development of the United States space program.

Description and history
Building 4572 is located in the Marshall Space Flight Center's East Test Area. Its frame is of steel, with a concrete foundation and concrete load frame. It is surrounded by support facilities, and is accompanied by Building 4573, a gantry crane with a capacity of 45 tons.

This facility was built in 1957 by the Army Ballistic Missile Agency and was the primary center responsible for the development of large vehicles and rocket propulsion systems.  The Saturn Family of launch vehicles was developed here under the direction of Wernher von Braun.  The Saturn V remains the most powerful launch vehicle ever brought to operational status, from a height, weight and payload standpoint.  The facility was planned to undergo modifications in the 2010s in anticipation of its use for testing a new generation of rockets.

See also
List of National Historic Landmarks in Alabama

References

External links

Aviation: From Sand Dunes to Sonic Booms, a National Park Service Discover Our Shared Heritage Travel Itinerary

Marshall Space Flight Center
National Historic Landmarks in Alabama
History of spaceflight
National Register of Historic Places in Huntsville, Alabama
1957 establishments in Alabama
Buildings and structures completed in 1957